The "White Camel" award is given to important contributors to the Perl Programming Language community.

The awards were initiated by Perl Mongers and O'Reilly & Associates at The Perl Conference in 1999. Today, The Perl Foundation acknowledges these exceptional individuals annually.

By Year 
 1999: Tom Christiansen, Kevin Lenzo, Adam Turoff
 2000: Elaine Ashton, Chris Nandor, Nathan Torkington
 2001: David H. Adler, Ask Bjørn Hansen, YAPC::Europe team
 2002: Graham Barr, Tim Maher, Tim Vroom
 2003: Jarkko Hietaniemi, Andreas Koenig, Robert Spier
 2004: Dave Cross, brian d foy, Jon Orwant
 2005: Stas Bekman, Eric Cholet, Andy Lester
 2006: Jay Hannah, Josh McAdams, Randal Schwartz
 2007: Allison Randal, Tim O'Reilly, Norbert E. Grüner
 2008: Tatsuhiko Miyagawa, Jacinta Richardson, Gabor Szabo
 2009: Tim Bunce, Philippe Bruhat, Michael Schwern
 2010: José Castro (cog), Paul Fenwick, Barbie
 2011: Leo Lapworth, Daisuke Maki, Andrew Shitov
 2012: Renee Baecker, Breno G. de Oliveira,  Jim Keenan
 2013: Thiago Rondon, Wendy and Liz, Fred Moyer
 2014: Amalia Pomian, VM Brasseur, Neil Bowers
 2015: Chris Prather, Sawyer X, Steffen Müller
 2016: David Golden, Karen Pauley, and Thomas Klausner
 2017: Laurent Boivin, Rob Masic, Kurt Demaagd
 2018: Todd Rinaldo, David Farrell, Max Maischein

See also 

 List of computer science awards
 Perl programming language
 YAPC, Yet Another Perl Conference
 The Perl Foundation
 O'Reilly and Associates

References

External links
 White camel information on perl.org
 The Second Annual YAPC
 News of the 2011 Award
 News of the 2012 Awards

Perl
Computer science awards